Mario Radaelli (9 September 1912 – ?) was an Italian hurdler who was 7th in the 400 m hs at the 1934 European Athletics Championships, one-time national champion at senior level (1934).

Achievements

See also
 Italy at the 1934 European Athletics Championships

References

1912 births
Year of death missing
Place of death missing
Italian male hurdlers